The Douglas Chair of Civil Law at the University of Glasgow was founded in 1948, and named after John Brown Douglas (c 1855–1935), who had been Professor of Roman Law at St Mungo's College. The name was changed in 2001 to the Douglas Chair in Roman Law when occupied by Olivia Robinson, but was changed back in 2006 when the current professor, Ernest Metzger, assumed the position.

The chair was occupied from 1965 to 1969 by Alan Watson, a graduate of the School of Law and now considered one of the world's foremost authorities on Roman Law.

John Brown Douglas
Douglas was born in England and graduated MA from the University in 1875 before becoming a solicitor. He was Professor of Roman Law at St Mungo's College.  In his will, he left a bequest to found the W.P. Ker Lectureship, established in 1938, in memory of the literary scholar, William Paton Ker.

The John B. Douglas Prize is awarded each year to the most distinguished student in the Civil Law class.

Douglas Professors of Civil Law
Tony Thomas (1957)
Alan Watson (1965)
William Gordon (1969)
Olivia F Robinson (2001)
Ernest Metzger (2006)

See also
 List of Professorships at the University of Glasgow
 University of Glasgow School of Law

Professorships at the University of Glasgow
Professorships in law
Douglas Chair